The Time of the Sun is an album by jazz trumpeter, composer and arranger, Tom Harrell, that was released in May 2011 by HighNote Records. It is the fourth album by Harrell's 2011-quintet of over six years, which includes Wayne Escoffery, Danny Grissett, Ugonna Okegwo and Johnathan Blake. The other albums by this group are Roman Nights, Prana Dance, and Light On. As with most of his album releases, Harrell composed all the tracks on this album. The title track is notable for the use of sounds produced by the magnetic field in the outer atmosphere of the sun, recorded by the astronomers at the University of Sheffield and Stanford University. Harrell received his sixth SESAC Jazz Award for this album, which topped the radio charts in the United States.

Track listing
All songs by Tom Harrell.

Personnel
Credits adapted from AllMusic.

Tom Harrell – composer, primary artist, producer, flugelhorn, trumpet
Johnathan Blake – drums
Wayne Escoffery – producer, sax (tenor)
Danny Grissett – fender rhodes, piano
Ugonna Okegwo – bass
Angela Harrell – producer
Joe Fields – executive producer
Mike Marciano – engineer
Keiji Obata – design
Salvatore Corso – photography
Ted Panken – liner notes

References 

2011 albums
Tom Harrell albums
HighNote Records albums